FC Uchkun Kara-Suu is a Kyrgyz football club based in Kara-Suu, Kyrgyzstan that played in the top division in Kyrgyzstan, the Kyrgyzstan League.

History 
199?: Founded as FC Uchkun Kara-Suu.

Achievements 
Kyrgyzstan League:
12th place: 1994

Kyrgyzstan Cup:

Current squad

External links 
Career stats by KLISF (only 1993-1994)

Football clubs in Kyrgyzstan